Layou is a small town located on the island of Saint Vincent, in Saint Andrew Parish. There is a post office, a police station and a library. There are also two quarries.

History
Layou is located on the western coast of Saint Vincent and the Grenadines and was one of the first areas of settlement by the French, who were the first Europeans to settle in St. Vincent and The Grenadines in the early part of the eighteenth century. Even before then the  Caribs used it as one of their settlements, as it is evident from the petroglyphs which are found in the area.

In 1763, St. Vincent was taken over by the British and the lands in Layou were bought by them to cultivate sugar. Layou was still a small area formed around Jackson Bay. The cultivation of sugar cane started growing and larger estates were needed, so that the smaller holdings of the French were consolidated into larger estates.

There were 3 main estates: Ruthland Vale estate, Akers estate and Palmiste Park estate. During slavery, most people lived on the estates but began to leave after slavery was abolished and to establish villages.

Immediately after Emancipation, the lands of one of the estates, Akers, were sold to form Cowdrey's Village. In 1861, Layou had a population of 140 people, Cowdrey's Village 227, while 333 people lived on the Ruthland Vale estate, 15 on what remained of the Akers estate and just five at the Palmiste Park estate.

The Ruthland Vale estate was sold after the eruption of the La Soufriere volcano in 1902.  were set aside for refugees from areas affected by the eruption.

Other changes began to take place in the area. The owner of what remained of the Ruthland Vale estates began to sell land to residents of Layou, and also residents of the estates began to move into Layou because employment possibilities on the estates were decreasing. Added to this, estate residents wanted to take advantage of social amenities, the school, clinic, church and cricket pitch among others. This led to an increase in population of Layou and also an enlargement of the town, since many of the smaller villages and estates settlements eventually became incorporated into the town of Layou.

Layou is located in the Constituency of Central Leeward.

Geography
Layou is located on the western coast of the island of Saint Vincent and the Grenadines. Located after the small fishing village of Buccament and before the town of Barrouallie on the Central leeward highway.

Climate
Layou has a seasonal tropical climate with a wet season lasting from May to November and a dry season lasting from January to May.

Urban structure
Layou is divided into various sections:

East:
 Cowdrey's Village
 Akers

Downtown:
 Bottom Garden
 Plan
 Bethrome

Uptown
 Swamp Gut
 Texier Road
 Ruthland Vale

West
 Bambereux

Education
Layou serves as an important educational centre for the people of Layou, Buccament and surrounding areas. The Layou Government School is located downtown in the Plan district of Layou. The Louis Straker Resource Centre is also an educational facility for evening classes and learning and literacy programs.

The waterfront project
For years the beautiful Leeward town of Layou has been threatened by the ocean. Years of wave action had seriously eroded the coastline threatening the main highway and access to the communities further north. In the late 1990s three storms wreaked havoc on the Layou waterfront and the problem became so critical that Government decided to move quickly to correct the situation.

A parliamentary representative for the area visited the site in July 2002 and promised to transform the area. Four years later in 2006, the waterfront project was considered completed. Today, it is a beautiful site in the town of Layou. Various activities are held at the Layou waterfront, such as the Nine Morning celebrations, which was Introduced in 2007.

Culture and entertainment

Petroglyphs
The Petroglyphs in Layou are located a short distance inland from the Leeward Highway in Layou. They are more visible if you outline them with a chalk, or get a local child to do it for you. They were made by the Caribs, when they settled there before the eighteenth century.

Christmas lighting

Layou has its annual Christmas lighting where the waterfront becomes filled with Christmas lights and decorations to welcome the festive season.

References

Populated places in Saint Vincent and the Grenadines